In accounting and contractual law, "golden hello" is a term used for several different arrangements:

 A payment made to induce an employee to take up employment from a specific employer in form of a welcome package or a payment from a rival employer to entice the employee to leave the other company.
 A payment from a government to employer (private company) during an economic recession who takes on new staff, usually superfluously, when job openings in general are scarce.
 In the United Kingdom, a financial incentive for graduates in science, technology, engineering, and mathematics (STEM) who are pursuing a career in teaching.

Risks and advantages

If the employee is worth the money 

A hiring company may spend millions of dollars for a golden hello package, hoping the poached executive generates more benefits for them than the cost of bonuses. Following the financial crisis of 2008–2009, such compensation methods have become controversial.

If the payment rate is right 

It's difficult to make the payment rate be an incentive for employees. Generally, employees who are senior-level receive higher golden hellos than entry-level or mid-level employees, considering the skills, experience and talent for specific positions.

Attracting talented recruitment 
In a study by Aerotek and the Human Capital Institute, 46% of professionals (570) at companies said that the best way to attract senior-level employees is bonuses. Employers can offer a one-time signing bonus or promise a specific timeline for raises to salaries.

Building trust between employee and new hire 
Golden Hello build the foundation for a positive relationship between an employer and a new employee. The study indicated that trust is built between employers and new hire when employers offer signing bonuses. This is also incentive for new employers to work harder.

Golden hello for academies 
In the UK, a golden hello is financial incentive, not for executives, but for attracting graduates in STEM (science, technology, engineering and maths) into teaching in an maintained secondary school.

The scholarships, funded by Department of Education, were introduced in 2011 and are offering £30,000 for graduates with a good degree in physics, chemistry, computing or maths in 2016/17.

According to the document of National College for Teaching and Leadership, golden hello is only available to teachers "who trained through a postgraduate initial teacher training (ITT) course leading to qualified teacher status (QTS)". Teachers must meet the training, teaching and application criteria, in oder to be eligible for golden hello payment.

Golden hello for high-ranking executives 
In the United States, golden hellos are typically offered to high-ranking executives by major corporations and may be  valued in the millions of dollars. They are said to have become "larger and more common" starting around the mid 1990s.

Further reading
 Golden boot compensation
 Golden handcuffs
 Golden handshake
 Golden parachute
 Voluntary redundancy
 Signing bonus

References

External links
 Golden Hello Investopedia
 Investors shooting themselves in foot with acceptance of "golden hellos"
 Golden Hello eligibility criteria and guidance for academies( National College for teaching&leadership)
Can offering a signing bonus motivate effort?
Scholarship Fundings from Department of Education
Pay without Performance
Four Reasons Signing Bonuses are Worth the Money

Business terms
Employment compensation
Recruitment